Colonel Hill is a town in the Bahamas, located on Crooked Island.  it has a population of 51.

The area is served by Colonel Hill Airport.

References

External links
World Gazetteer

Populated places in the Bahamas